The Lotud people are an  indigenous ethnic group residing in Sabah, eastern Malaysia on the island of Borneo. They reside mainly in the Tuaran district (including the Tamparuli as well as Kiulu sub-districts) and also a portion of this tribe's population also reside in the village of Kampung Sukoli located in the Telipok suburban township of Kota Kinabalu city, all located in the West Coast Division of Sabah. Their population was estimated at 5,000 in the year 1985 but now believed to be more than 20,000. They are a sub-ethnic group of the Dusunic group, now also known as Kadazan-Dusun.

Nowadays, most of this ethnic group's population has been Christianized by adhering to denominations such as Roman Catholicism (in Tuaran district proper as well as the suburban township of Telipok in Kota Kinabalu city) and Seventh-Day Adventism (mostly those residing in Tamparuli and Kiulu) with a large Muslim minority (both converts and Muslim by birth and ethnic descent) and some lesser extent to evangelical Christianity (Sidang Injil Borneo) as well as Anglicanism and Lutheranism (Basel Christian Church of Malaysia), with a dwindling number are still animists. Less than 20 traditional priestesses are still alive, with no prospect of future replacement.

References 

Kadazan-Dusun people
Ethnic groups in Sabah